Potassium phthalimide is a chemical compound of formula C8H4KNO2. It is the potassium salt of phthalimide, and usually presents as fluffy, very pale yellow crystals. It can be prepared by adding a hot solution of phthalimide in ethanol to a solution of potassium hydroxide in ethanol; the desired product precipitates.

This compound is a commercially available reagent used in the Gabriel synthesis of amines.

References

Potassium compounds
Phthalimides